Darrall Tucker Imhoff (October 11, 1938 – June 30, 2017) was an American professional basketball player. He spent 12 seasons in the National Basketball Association (NBA), playing for six teams from 1960 to 1972. He made an NBA All-Star team, and was also an Olympic Gold medalist. He is perhaps best remembered for being one of the defenders tasked with guarding Wilt Chamberlain during his famed 100-point game in 1962.

Early life
Darrall Imhoff was born October 11, 1938 to Clark and Lorraine (Tucker) Imhoff.
He grew up in San Gabriel, California and attended Alhambra High School, Alhambra, California.

College career
After making the team as a walk-on at the University of California, Berkeley, Imhoff was a two-time All-American and was the top rebounder on the 1959 NCAA championship team and hit the winning basket with :17 remaining. He was the leading scorer and rebounder on the 1960 NCAA runner-up Berkeley team and was a member of the gold medal-winning 1960 Olympic basketball team.

As a collegian, Imhoff was feared as a shot blocker, and was a respected rebounder who was the hub around which coach Pete Newell built his NCAA champion University of California team. The Golden Bears edged Jerry West's West Virginia University team in 1959, with Imhoff rated by some the best college player in the country. In 1960, leading the nation's top-rated defense from his center spot, the 6'10" 235-pounder led Cal back to the NCAA finals before losing to Jerry Lucas and Ohio State. He was a two-time First Team All-American and a member of Berkeley's Nu chapter of Phi Kappa Tau fraternity.

Imhoff was inducted into the Cal Athletic Hall of Fame in 1988 and enshrined in the Pac-10 Hall of Honor in 2005. His jersey at Cal (No. 40) was retired during a game between Cal and Stanford at Haas Pavilion on February 14, 2009.

In 75 career games at Cal, Ihmoff averaged 10.0 points and 9.5 rebounds.

1960 Olympics
Imhoff was a senior awaiting entry into the National Basketball Association in 1960 when Hall of Fame Coach Pete Newell, now the U.S. Olympic coach, added his prize player to the 1960 United States men's Olympic basketball team for the Summer Olympic Games. Walt Bellamy and Imhoff saw action together as center and power-forward during the Rome Games, especially against the tall Soviet national team, as the Americans usually jetted out to a big lead early and then rested their starters.

The Olympic roster included Hall of Fame players Bellamy, Oscar Robertson, Jerry West, Jerry Lucas and Bob Boozer, among others. Imhoff averaged 4.5 points in the 8 games as the Team USA captured the Gold Medal.

The entire 1960 United States men's Olympic basketball team and coaching staff was inducted into the Naismith Hall of Fame in 2011.

NBA career

New York Knicks
Imhoff was the most highly publicized draft pick of the 1960 NBA Draft. The New York Knicks, picking third overall, made him their first pick, a move which generated much excitement for the team. The Knicks had two all-stars already, Richie Guerin and Willie Naulls, and looked for Imhoff to complete a potential contender in the league's largest city.

Imhoff, unfortunately, was not up to the pressure and had a season which fell well below hopes.

Disappointed, he was the backup center by season's end. He was the starter in a March 1962 game when Philadelphia Warriors center Wilt Chamberlain set an NBA record scoring 100 points in a game. After the season, Imhoff was traded to the Detroit Pistons for their All-Star guard Gene Shue.

Detroit Pistons
Imhoff's lack of shooting skills at the NBA level had been exposed, but he never quit working to improve. He began to see more minutes with the Pistons until he was dealt to the Los Angeles Lakers in 1964.

Los Angeles Lakers
On a star-studded team that included Jerry West, Elgin Baylor and others, Imhoff was now a respected reserve. He contributed solidly to a team that won the NBA Western Division and made it to the NBA Finals in 1965. The Lakers were encouraged enough to start Imhoff the next season. Los Angeles again took the Western Division, but were Finals runner-up again to the Boston Celtics. 

Finally, in the 1966–67 season, Imhoff realised some of his potential, averaging 12 points, 13 rebounds, 3 assists and 2 blocks per game as a Laker starter. He made the 1967 NBA All-Star Team. 

Following the 1967–68 season, the Lakers acquired Wilt Chamberlain from the Philadelphia 76ers in a multi-player trade that sent Imhoff to Philadelphia.

Philadelphia 76ers
The 76ers were second in the East in 1968–69, but were knocked out by Boston and Russell again in the playoffs. Imhoff was a starter again for the 1969–70 campaign and Philadelphia made it to the playoffs before losing to Milwaukee and Lew Alcindor.

Cincinnati Royals
He was traded to Cincinnati at the start of the 1970–71 season for 2 players and second round draft choice and became the starting center until he tore a cartilage and ACL and had surgery. He re-injured the knee again at the start of the next season and was put on waivers.

Portland Trail Blazers
Portland signed Imhoff to a new contract for the remainder of the 1971–72 season and finished his career at the end of Portland's bench in 1972. Imhoff retired with a bad knee and had surgery in January 1973 to repair his ACL.

Career Summary
In 801 career NBA games over 12 seasons, Imhoff averaged 7.2 points, 7.6 rebounds and 1.8 assists.

Personal
After retiring Imhoff lived in Hillsboro and Eugene, Oregon. He was the Vice President of Sales & Marketing at the United States Basketball Academy (USBA), a prestigious, internationally recognized basketball camp located in Oregon's McKenzie River Valley, about 45 miles east of Eugene prior to his retirement.

He was also active in the Fellowship of Christian Athletes, the Providence Child Center and Rotary International.

He was married to wife Susan and had three daughters, Karen, Diana and Nancy, and two sons, David and Robert. 

His daughter Nancy was inducted into the Idaho State University Sports Hall of Fame in 2005.

Imhoff's grandson, Damon Jones, is currently a pitcher for the Philadelphia Phillies of Major League Baseball.

Imhoff died on June 30, 2017, in Bend, Oregon of a heart attack. He was survived by his children, 18 grandchildren and three great-grandchildren.

Honors
 Imhoff was inducted into the Cal Athletic Hall of Fame in 1988
 In 2005, Imhoff was enshrined in the Pac-10 Hall of Honor in 2005.
 His jersey at Cal (No. 40) was retired in 2009. The ceremony took place at the game between Cal and Stanford at Haas Pavilion on February 14, 2009.
 In 2011, the entire 1960 United States men's Olympic basketball team and coaching staff was inducted into the Naismith Hall of Fame.

NBA career statistics

Regular season

Playoffs

References

External links
Darrall Imhoff Profile and Stats  at LakersWeb.com

1938 births
2017 deaths
All-American college men's basketball players
American men's basketball players
Basketball players at the 1960 Summer Olympics
Basketball players from California
California Golden Bears men's basketball players
Centers (basketball)
Cincinnati Royals players
Detroit Pistons players
Los Angeles Lakers players
Medalists at the 1960 Summer Olympics
National Basketball Association All-Stars
New York Knicks draft picks
New York Knicks players
Olympic gold medalists for the United States in basketball
People from San Gabriel, California
Philadelphia 76ers players
Portland Trail Blazers players
Sportspeople from Alhambra, California
Sportspeople from Eugene, Oregon
Sportspeople from Hillsboro, Oregon
United States men's national basketball team players